Emma Stone is an American actress who aspired to an acting career from an early age. She had her first role onstage at age 11, and followed with parts in sixteen plays in a regional theater in Arizona. Stone made her television debut in the unsold pilot for the reality show The New Partridge Family (2005). After brief television roles in Medium, Malcolm in the Middle, and Lucky Louie, she made her film debut in the comedy Superbad (2007).

Stone appeared as a ghost in Ghosts of Girlfriends Past (2009), and found commercial success with the horror comedy Zombieland, where she played a zombie apocalypse survivor. Her breakthrough came with her first leading role (a high school student perceived to be sexually promiscuous) in the teen comedy Easy A (2010). She subsequently received nominations for the Golden Globe Award for Best Actress – Motion Picture Comedy or Musical and the BAFTA Rising Star Award. In 2011, she starred in the romantic comedy Crazy, Stupid, Love and in the period drama The Help, which were both commercial successes. Stone's success continued with her role as Gwen Stacy in the 2012 superhero film The Amazing Spider-Man that became her highest-grossing release, with a worldwide revenue of $757 million, and she later reprised the role in its 2014 sequel.

Critical success followed with her performance as a recovering drug addict in Alejandro González Iñárritu's black comedy-drama Birdman or (The Unexpected Virtue of Ignorance) (2014). It earned her a nomination for the Academy Award for Best Supporting Actress. Later that year, she made her Broadway debut in a revival of the musical Cabaret (2014–2015). Stone won the Academy Award for Best Actress for her performance as an aspiring actress in Damien Chazelle's musical La La Land (2016). Stone also recorded six songs such as "City of Stars" for the film's soundtrack. She went on to star and serve as an executive producer in the Netflix black comedy miniseries Maniac (2018),  and received another Oscar nomination for her portrayal of Abigail Masham in Yorgos Lanthimos' period black comedy The Favourite (2018).

Film

Television

Video games

Theater

Discography

Music videos

See also
 List of awards and nominations received by Emma Stone
 List of actors with Academy Award nominations
 List of actors with two or more Academy Award nominations in acting categories

References

Actress filmographies
American filmographies
Performances